Cryptomonada is a proposed super-class of Cryptists linking Cryptophyceae and Goniomonadea, which was first proposed by Cavalier-Smith in 2004. He made this proposal based on three shared morphological characteristics: Presence of a periplast, ejectisomes with secondary scroll, and mitochondrial cristae with flat tubules.

Genetic studies as early as 1994 also supported the hypothesis that Goniomonas was sister to Cryptophyceae. A study in 2018 found strong evidence that the common ancestor of Cryptomonada was an autotrophic protist.

References 

Cryptista